State Road 252 (NM 252) is a  state highway in the U.S. state of New Mexico. Its southern terminus is at U.S. Route 60 (US 60) and US 84 in Taiban, and the northern terminus is in Ragland at NM 209.

Major intersections

See also

References

252
Transportation in De Baca County, New Mexico
Transportation in Quay County, New Mexico